Hladkivka（），is a village in southern Ukraine, and is located in Skadovsk Raion of Kherson Oblast.

Demographics 

In 1886, the population of the village was 2,178.

In the 2001 Ukrainian census, the population was 2,910. Within it, 87.84% spoke Ukrainian as a native language, while 10.51% spoke Russian and 1.65% spoke a third language.

History 

The population suffered through the Second Holodomor in 1946-1947, with many dying of starvation.

In 2022, the village was captured by Russian forces during the southern campaign of the Russian invasion of Ukraine, and currently remains under occupation.

References 

 Погода в селі Гладківка (Archived)

Villages in Skadovsk Raion